Van Es is a Dutch toponymic surname, literally translating to "from the ash tree". Alternatively, a family may have originated from Esch in North Brabant. Variants are Van Esch, Van Ess People with this name include:

Van Es
Adri van Es (1913–1994), Dutch vice-admiral and state secretary of defence
Andrée van Es (born 1953), Dutch GreenLeft politician
Bart van Es (born 1972), British scholar and literary academic
Ed van Es (born 1959) Dutch water-polo player
Hubert van Es (1941–2009) Dutch photographer
Jacob Foppens van Es (1596–1666), Flemish still-life painter
 (born 1968), Dutch violinist and singer
Kika van Es (born 1991), Dutch football defender
Ronny van Es (born 1978), Dutch footballer
Wim van Es (born 1934), Dutch archaeologist
Van Esch
Nicolaus van Esch (1507–1578), Dutch Roman Catholic theologian and mystical writer
Van Ess
Johann Heinrich van Ess (1772–1847), German Catholic theologian
John van Ess (1879–1949), American missionary in Iraq

See also
Van Essen

References

Dutch-language surnames
Surnames of Dutch origin
Toponymic surnames